Samuel Ofosu-Mensah is a Ghanaian politician and a member of the First Parliament of the Fourth Republic representing the Asante-Akim South Constituency in the Ashanti Region of Ghana. He represented the constituency on the ticket of the National Democratic Congress.

Early life and education
Ofosu-Mensah was born in 1935 at Asante-Akim Wenchi in the Ashanti Region of Ghana. 
He attended the Presbyterian College of Education, Akropong (then the Presbyterian Training College, Akropong) where he obtained his Teachers' Training Certificate (Certificate A), and the Kwame Nkrumah University of Science and Technology (then the University of Science and Technology,  Kumasi) where he obtained his GCE Ordinary Level and Advanced Level Certificates in 1953 and 1955 respectively. He later  proceeded to the University of Massachusetts Amherst to study a Diploma programme in Tropical Agriculture, after which he was awarded his Diploma Certificate in 1962. He also attended Aberystwyth University (then a constituent college of the University of Wales known as the University of Wales, Aberystwyth), where he was awarded his Master of Science in Agricultural Economics in 1982.

Politics
Ofosu-Mensah was elected into parliament on the ticket of the National Democratic Congress during the December 1992 Ghanaian parliamentary election to represent the Asante Akim South Constituency in the Ashanti Region of Ghana. He lost his seat to his opponent Alex Kwaku Korankye of the New Patriotic Party who polled 18,646 votes out of the total valid votes cast representing 43.00% during the 1996 Ghanaian general election.

Career
Ofosu-Mensah is a businessman and a former member of parliament for the Asante Akim South constituency in the Ashanti Region of Ghana. He served for one term as a parliamentarian for the constituency.

Personal life
He is a Christian.

References

Living people
1935 births
National Democratic Congress (Ghana) politicians
Ghanaian MPs 1993–1997
Ghanaian Christians
Ghanaian businesspeople
Alumni of the University of Wales
People from Ashanti Region